Neoclinus chihiroe is a species of chaenopsid blenny found around Japan, in the northwest Pacific ocean. It can reach a maximum length of  SL.

Etymology 
The specific name "chihiroe" refers to Chihiro Okazaki, the wife of Dr. Toshio Okazaki, whom Fukao credits with leading to the discovery of Neoclinus chihiroe sister taxon N. okazakii.

References
 Fukao, R., 1987 (10 Dec.) Fishes of Neoclinus bryope species complex from Shirahama, Japan, with description of two new species. Japanese Journal of Ichthyology v. 34 (no. 3): 291–308.

chihiroe
Fish described in 1987